Thomas Randles (born 13 October 1940) is an English former footballer who played in the Football League for Stoke City.

Career
Randles played for Ellesmere Port before joining Stoke City in 1961. He made two appearances for Stoke both coming in games against Liverpool at the end of the 1961–62 season. Randles emigrated to New Zealand in 1963 and went to play for various Kiwi and Australian teams and also played four times for the  New Zealand national team.

Career statistics
Source:

References

1940 births
Living people
Sportspeople from Blackpool
English footballers
Association football forwards
Ellesmere Port Town F.C. players
Stoke City F.C. players
English Football League players
New Zealand association footballers
New Zealand international footballers
APIA Leichhardt FC players
Sydney United 58 FC players
Christchurch United players